Cheongna International City is a station of the AREX in Gyeongseo-dong, Seo District, Incheon, South Korea.

It is situated near the entrance of the Incheon International Airport Expressway. It has an unusual design: the first building is built for access to the station, and the second building, which houses the platforms, is connected to the first building with a skybridge.

Station layout

External links

Railway stations opened in 2014
Metro stations in Incheon
Seo District, Incheon
AREX
2014 establishments in South Korea
Transport in South Korea